Amphithyris is a genus of brachiopods belonging to the family Platidiidae.

The species of this genus are found in Australia and New Zealand.

Species:

Amphithyris buckmani 
Amphithyris cavernicola 
Amphithyris comitodentis 
Amphithyris hallettensis 
Amphithyris parva 
Amphithyris richardsonae 
Amphithyris richardsoni
Amphithyris seminula

References

Brachiopod genera